The United Nationalist Alliance (UNA) is a political party in the Philippines. It was created as a multi-party electoral alliance  replacing the former United Opposition (UNO) coalition for the 2013 midterm elections, before it was launched as a single political party on July 1, 2015, by Jejomar Binay for his candidacy in the 2016 presidential election.

The acronym "UNA" spells out the Filipino-Spanish word for "first".

History

Formation, 2013 elections (2012–2015)
The Pwersa ng Masang Pilipino (PMP), headed by former president Joseph Estrada, and the Partido Demokratiko Pilipino-Lakas ng Bayan (PDP–Laban), headed by Vice President Jejomar Binay, signed a coalition agreement on April 4, 2012, for the 2013 elections, forming the United Nationalist Alliance (UNA). The two parties had been partners in the United Opposition in the 2007 election, and Estrada and Binay were running mates during the 2010 presidential election. Aquilino Pimentel III, PDP–Laban president, has stated that the UNA's senatorial slate is now more than twelve members and is being trimmed down; he had also expressed reservations on the inclusion of Juan Miguel Zubiri, of whom he had won an election protest after the 2007 election. In March 2014, Binay resign as Chairman of PDP–Laban, as result the PMP party the only primary party of UNA banner.

Binay's presidential bid (2015–2016)

On July 1, 2015, Binay relaunched the United Nationalist Alliance as the major opposition party at the Makati Coliseum in Makati days after he resigned from the Cabinet of President Noynoy Aquino, despite the absence of Manila Mayor Joseph Estrada which become neutral due to Sen. Grace Poe possible presidential bid. Sarangani Rep. Manny Pacquiao, was touted a possible running mate, but being 36 years old at that time, he was barred by the Philippine constitution's age requirement of 40 years. Senator Bongbong Marcos was then considered to be his running mate before settling with Senator Gregorio Honasan, who is also the party's vice president.

Coalition members

Affiliated local parties
Makatizens United Party – Makati

Former 
Partido Demokratiko Pilipino-Lakas ng Bayan (PDP–Laban) (2012 – March 7, 2014)
One Cebu (1-Cebu) (2016) (switched allegiance to PDP–Laban)
Pwersa ng Masang Pilipino (PMP) Joseph Estrada wing (2012—15)
Nationalist People's Coalition (NPC) Mark Cojuangco wing
Nacionalista Party (NP) 
Lakas–CMD

Former affiliated local parties
Asenso Manileño (Progress for Manilans) – Manila (switched allegiance to Aksyon Demokratiko)
Padayon Pilipino (Filipinos Ahead) – Misamis Oriental and Cagayan de Oro
Partido Magdiwang (Magdiwang Party) – San Juan  (switched allegiance to PDP-Laban)
Partido Navoteño (Party of the People of Navotas) – Navotas
People's Champ Movement – Sarangani
Team Casimiro – Las Piñas
Timpuyog ti Baguio (Baguio Alliance) – Baguio
Timawa – Iloilo City
Padayon Pilipino (PDP) – Cagayan de Oro
Ugyon Kita Capiz (UK CAPIZ) – Capiz
Abyan Ilonggo – Iloilo
Bukidnon Paglaum Party (BPP) – Bukidnon
Alliance of Parties for Progress – Zamboanga del Norte
Biskeg – Pangasinan
Bagong Lakas ng Nueva Ecija (BALANE) – Nueva Ecija
Lilia Pineda Kambilan – Pampanga
Partido Magdalo – Cavite (switched allegiance to PDP-Laban)
Team Crisologo (formerly Team Un1ty) – Quezon City (District 1)
Dr. Lito Roxas Team Dr. Roxas – Pasay

Despite the similarity in names, the local party United Negros Alliance from Negros Occidental is not related nor affiliated to the party.

Senatorial candidates
On May 3, 2012, Zubiri took an oath to become a member of the PMP; Estrada and Binay were optimistic that Pimentel and Zubiri will be able to reconcile their differences prior to the start of the campaign.

On May 10, 2012, UNA announced its first five senatorial candidates: re-electionist Sens. Aquilino Pimentel III and Gregorio Honasan, Representatives Jack Enrile and JV Ejercito, and 2010 senatorial candidate Joey de Venecia.

On June 11, 2012, UNA formally included Zubiri in its line-up, together with Cebu Governor Gwendolyn Garcia and Zambales Representative Mitos Magsaysay. On June 28, 2012, Pimentel officially declined his spot in the UNA line-up, citing Zubiri's continued inclusion in it.

The UNA announced on August that former senators Dick Gordon and Ernesto Maceda were a part of their ticket, and that Senator Loren Legarda would be one of the last three candidates yet to be named in their ticket. UNA spokesperson JV Bautista also said that Pimentel has taken a leave of absence as PDP–Laban's presidency, and that PDP–Laban will not be in Pimentel's certificate of nomination as the latter is running under the Liberal Party. However, Pimentel denied that he took a leave of absence from the PDP–Laban presidency.

On the first day of filing of certificates of candidacies, senatorial nominees of UNA filed theirs at the Commission on Elections national offices at Intramuros.  Joey de Venecia withdrew from the election as he cited his business endeavors as reasons for his withdrawal; speculation was rife when Lorenzo Tañada III was one of the persons considered to fill in de Venecia's slot in the ticket, but Binay disclosed that Tañada was not in their choices "any more." On October 4, UNA announced that Binay's daughter Nancy was their 12th nominee.

On February 21, 2013, UNA dropped Chiz Escudero, Loren Legarda and Grace Poe from their senatorial slate as a result of their non-attendance in their political rallies.

2013 election

2016 election

President: Jejomar Binay (Lost)
Vice-president: Gregorio Honasan (Lost)
Senate Candidates:
Jacel Kiram (Lost)
 Alma Moreno Lacsamana (Lost)
Rey Langit (Lost)
Allan Montaño (Lost)
 Getulio Napeñas (Lost)
 Manny Pacquiao (Won)

2019 election

 Nancy Binay (Won)
 Dan Roleda (Lost)

2022 election

 Jejomar Binay (Lost)

Electoral performance

Presidential and vice presidential elections

Legislative elections

See also
 Genuine Opposition
 Koalisyon ng Nagkakaisang Pilipino 
 Laban ng Makabayang Masang Pilipino
 Puwersa ng Masa
 Team PNoy
 Koalisyon ng Daang Matuwid
 Partido Galing at Puso

References

External links

2012 establishments in the Philippines
2013 elections in the Philippines
Conservative parties in the Philippines
Filipino nationalism
Paternalistic conservatism
Political parties established in 2012